The 2017–18 Syracuse Orange women's basketball team represents Syracuse University during the 2017–18 NCAA Division I women's basketball season. The Orange, led by eleventh year head coach Quentin Hillsman. The Orange were fifth year members of the Atlantic Coast Conference and play their home games at the Carrier Dome. They finished the season 22–9, 10–6 in ACC play to finish in a 3 way tie for sixth place. They lost in the second round of the ACC women's tournament to Virginia Tech. They received an at-large bid of the NCAA women's tournament where they lost to Oklahoma State in the first round.

Roster

Schedule

|-
!colspan=9 style="background:#D44500; color:#212B6D;"|Non-conference regular season

|-
!colspan=9 style="background:#D44500; color:#212B6D;"| ACC regular season

|-
!colspan=9 style="background:#D44500; color:#212B6D;"| ACC Women's Tournament

|-
!colspan=9 style="background:#D44500; color:#212B6D;"| NCAA Women's Tournament

Rankings

See also
 2017–18 Syracuse Orange men's basketball team

References

Syracuse Orange women's basketball seasons
Syracuse
Syracuse basketball, women
Syracuse basketball, women
Syracuse